Alan Paul Wichinsky (born November 23, 1949, Newark, New Jersey) is a Grammy Award-winning singer and composer, best known as one of the founding members of the current incarnation of the vocal group The Manhattan Transfer.

Education
Raised in Newark and Hillside, New Jersey Paul graduated from Hillside High School and attended Newark State College (now Kean University) where he earned a BA in Music Education. He received two Honorary Doctorate degrees, one in The Humanities from Kean University and another in Music from Berklee School of Music.

Career
He began his professional career on Broadway at the age of 12 in the original cast of Oliver! After college, he returned to Broadway as Teen Angel and Johnny Casino in the original cast of Grease, where he introduced the songs "Beauty School Dropout" and "Born to Hand Jive". In 2004, he released a solo CD called Another Place in Time. He also provided Dino Spumoni's singing voice on the animated television series Hey Arnold!

Awards
As a writer and arranger for The Manhattan Transfer, he earned four Grammy nominations for his compositions "Twilight Zone/Twilight Tone" and "Code Of Ethics" and for his vocal arrangements for "Ray’s Rockhouse". He received a Grammy nomination for Best Jazz Vocalist, Male.

Personal life
Paul has been married to writer/model Angela Paul for 30 years; they have one daughter, Arielle.

References

External links 
 Alan Paul  on The Manhattan Transfer Official Website (requires Flash)

1949 births
Living people
American male singers
The Manhattan Transfer members
Kean University alumni
American male musical theatre actors
Grammy Award for Best Jazz Fusion Performance
Hillside High School (New Jersey) alumni
Singers from New Jersey
People from Hillside, New Jersey
Musicians from Newark, New Jersey